The 1946 All-Eastern football team consists of American football players chosen at the end of the 1946 college football season as the best at each position from teams playing college football at schools in the Eastern United States.  The organizations selecting All-Eastern teams in 1946 included the Associated Press (AP) and the International News Service (INS).

All-Eastern selections

Backs
 Arnold Tucker, Army (AP-1; INS-1 [qb])
 Glenn Davis, Army (AP-1, INS-1 [hb])
 Skip Minisi, Penn (AP-1)
 Doc Blanchard, Army (AP-1; INS-1 [rb])
 Levi Jackson, Yale (AP-2, INS-1 [hb])
 Lou Kusserow, Columbia (AP-2)
 Joe Watts, Syracuse (AP-2)
 Don Panciera, Boston College (AP-2, INS-2 [qb])
 Maderak, Penn State (INS-2 [hb])
 Kuleles, Boston College (INS-2 [hb])
 Mandarino, Syracuse (INS-2 [hb])

Ends
 Hank Foldberg, Army (AP-1, INS-1)
 Bill Swiacki, Columbia (AP-1; INS-1)
 George Poole, Army (AP-2)
 James Dieckelman, Holy Cross (AP-2)
 Irving Mondschein, NYU (INS-2)
 Monahan, Dartmouth (INS-2)

Tackles
 Frank Wydo, Cornell (AP-1, INS-1)
 Bernie Gallagher, Penn (AP-1)
 Jim Carrington, Navy (INS-1)
 James Lalikos, Brown (AP-2)
 Goble Bryant, Army (AP-2)
 Furman, Cornell (INS-2)
 Bill Schuler, Yale (INS-2)

Guards
 Emil Drvaric, Harvard (AP-1)
 Fritz Barzilauskas, Yale (AP-1, INS-1)
 Joe Steffy, Army (INS-1)
 Arthur Gerometta, Army (AP-2)
 Robert Rutkowski, Penn (AP-2)
 McClellan, Brown (INS-2)
 Robert Orlando, Colgate (INS-2)

Centers
 Chuck Bednarik, Penn (AP-1, INS-1)
 Richard Scott, Navy (AP-2)
 Fisher, Harvard (INS-2)

Key

AP = Associated Press

INS = International News Service

See also
1946 College Football All-America Team

References

All-Eastern football team
All-Eastern college football teams